Opisthodactylus is an extinct genus of rhea from the Early to Middle Miocene Santa Cruz and Chichinales Formations and the Late Miocene (Montehermosan) Andalhuala Formation of Argentina. Three species are described: the type species, O. patagonicus, O. kirchneri and O. horacioperezi. The species O. kirchneri was described in 2017 by Noriega et al. Fossils of O. horacioperezi were found together with fossils of Patagorhacos terrificus.

References

Further reading 
 The Origin and Evolution of Birds by Alan Feduccia

Rheidae
Ratites
Miocene birds of South America
Montehermosan
Laventan
Colloncuran
Friasian
Santacrucian
Colhuehuapian
Neogene Argentina
Fossils of Argentina
Fossil taxa described in 1891
Taxa named by Florentino Ameghino
Chichinales Formation